The Bergmann Mars was Theodor Bergmann's first successful military pistol design.  The pistol was originally designed for the 7.63 Mauser cartridge, but was soon changed to the proprietary 9mm Bergmann cartridge.

Military service
The Mars was adopted by the Spanish government in 1905, however, later they  were evidently not delivered or fielded.  Prototype Mars pistols in .45 ACP were submitted for military testing by the United States in 1906, but were not selected for adoption.

References

Shideler, Dan. 2008 Standard Catalog of Firearms.  Krause Publications, 2008.  .

Semi-automatic pistols 1901–1909